|}

The Prix de Saint-Georges is a Group 3 flat horse race in France open to thoroughbreds aged three years or older. It is run over a distance of 1,000 metres (about 5 furlongs) at Longchamp in May.

History
The event is named after Haras de Saint-Georges, a stud farm near Moulins owned by Emmanuel d'Harcourt (1844–1928). The race was established in 1929, and the first running was won by Clarawood.

The Prix de Saint-Georges was cancelled in 1940, and held at Maisons-Laffitte from 1943 to 1945. It was staged at Chantilly in 1968.

The present race grading system was introduced in 1971, and the Prix de Saint-Georges was subsequently given Group 3 status.

It is currently one of four open-age 1,000-metre Group races in France. The others are the Prix du Gros Chêne, the Prix du Petit Couvert and the Prix de l'Abbaye.

Records
Most successful horse (3 wins):
 Constans – 1972, 1973, 1974

Leading jockey (5 wins):
 Yves Saint-Martin – Jannic (1960), Fortino (1962), Montgomery (1971), Adraan (1980), Last Tycoon (1986)

Leading trainer (5 wins):
 François Mathet – Polic (1957), Texana (1958), Jannic (1960), Fortino (1962), Adraan (1980)

Leading owner (4 wins):
 François Dupré – Polic (1957), Texana (1958), Jannic (1960), Fortino (1962)
 Monica Sheriffe – Constans (1972, 1973, 1974), Sharpo (1981)

Winners since 1980

 Inxile finished first in 2009, but he was relegated to third place following a stewards' inquiry.

 The 2016 and 2017 runnings took place at Deauville while Longchamp was closed for redevelopment.

Earlier winners

 1929: Clarawood
 1930: Zambelli
 1931: Dickens
 1932: My Beauty
 1933: La Pommeraie
 1934: Makila
 1935: If
 1936: Fingall
 1937: Iskandar
 1938: Turbator
 1939: Simone
 1940: no race
 1941: Thread
 1942: Djerme
 1943: Fine Art
 1944: Tango
 1945:
 1946: Boree
 1947: Thiercelin
 1948: Merry Maid
 1949: Rio
 1950: Sarrau
 1951: Fast Street
 1952:
 1953: Aria Viva
 1954:
 1955: Basque
 1956: Palariva
 1957: Polic
 1958: Texana
 1959: Blysmus
 1960: Jannic
 1961: Carissimo
 1962: Fortino
 1963: L'Épinay
 1964: Takawalk
 1965: Polyfoto
 1966: Yours
 1967: Yours
 1968: Tudor Black
 1969: Lear Jet
 1970: Prime Action
 1971: Montgomery
 1972: Constans
 1973: Constans
 1974: Constans
 1975: Flirting Around
 1976: Girl Friend
 1977: Girl Friend
 1978: Polyponder
 1979: King of Macedon

See also
 List of French flat horse races

References

 France Galop / Racing Post:

 france-galop.com – A Brief History: Prix de Saint-Georges.
 galop.courses-france.com – Prix de Saint-Georges – Palmarès depuis 1980.
 galopp-sieger.de – Prix de Saint-Georges.
 horseracingintfed.com – International Federation of Horseracing Authorities – Prix de Saint-Georges (2017).
 pedigreequery.com – Prix de Saint-Georges – Longchamp.

Open sprint category horse races
Longchamp Racecourse
Horse races in France
1929 establishments in France
Recurring sporting events established in 1929